Larry Neil Vanderhoef (March 20, 1941 – October 15, 2015) was an American biochemist and academic. He was the 5th chancellor of University of California, Davis.

Biography
Vanderhoef was born in Perham, Minnesota to Wilmar James Vanderhoef and Ida Lucille Wothe. He received his B.A. and M.S. in biology from the University of Wisconsin–Milwaukee, and a Ph.D. in plant biochemistry from Purdue University.

Vanderhoef's research interests included the general area of plant growth and development, and in the evolution of the land-grant universities. He taught classes at levels from freshman to advanced graduate study.

The Regents of the University of California named Vanderhoef the fifth chancellor of UC Davis in 1994. He served on various national commissions addressing graduate and international education, the role of a modern land-grant university, and accrediting issues.

On June 2, 2008, Vanderhoef announced his intention to resign as chancellor on June 30, 2009, ending his tenure of more than fifteen years. In Summer 2009, former University of Illinois at Urbana-Champaign Provost Linda P.B. Katehi succeeded Vanderhoef as Chancellor of UC Davis.

Vanderhoef died on October 15, 2015, from complications due to a series of ischemic strokes, the first of which occurred in November 2012.

References

External links

Vanderhoef's website at UC Davis
 Larry Vanderhoef biography at Daviswiki

People from Perham, Minnesota
American biochemists
American people of Dutch descent
Chancellors of the University of California, Davis
Purdue University College of Agriculture alumni
University of Wisconsin–Milwaukee alumni
1941 births
2015 deaths